Guido Grabow (born 7 October 1959 in Opladen) is a German rower. Together with his brother Volker he was a top rower in the coxless four.

References 

 
 

1959 births
Living people
Sportspeople from Leverkusen
Rowers at the 1984 Summer Olympics
Rowers at the 1988 Summer Olympics
Olympic bronze medalists for West Germany
Olympic rowers of West Germany
Olympic medalists in rowing
West German male rowers
World Rowing Championships medalists for West Germany
Medalists at the 1988 Summer Olympics